This is a list of films in which the theme of socialism features prominently in the movie.

Capitalism: A Love Story - 2009 - by American film maker Michael Moore. A documentary exploring and criticizing capitalism in America.
Che - 2008 - is a two part biopic about the socialist revolutionary Ernesto "Che" Guevara.
Sicko - 2007 - by American film maker Michael Moore. A documentary investigating health care in the United States and how it compares with socialized public health services.
Lights in the Dusk - 2006 - by Aki Kaurismäki. It has been argued that this film deals with the ways in which "[c]apitalism has painted the town red, just a different shade of red from its socialist connotations" as well as that "rock is so important to the director that a number of his males, including Koistinen, favor a 50s, greasy, sweptback hair style, to go along with their love of rock 'n' roll (definitely a reminder of how rock was the way to rebel in socialist countries)."
The Wind That Shakes The Barley - 2006 - A film set during the Irish War of Independence and Irish Civil War. The film shows the divergences in the Irish republican movement during the revolutionary period and the civil war.
The Killing Fields - 1984 - about the Khmer Rouge regime in Cambodia.
Reds - 1981 -  Film about the life and career of John Reed, particularly his time in Petrograd which formed the basis of his book, Ten Days That Shook the World. 
 Winstanley - 1975 - A film about Gerrard Winstanley who along with the group known as the Diggers carried out one of the world's first socialist living experiments. The film reflects class antagonism between peasants and lords in a feudal economy.
 The Working Class Goes to Heaven - 1971 - Italian film
 Modern Times - 1936 - The film references the struggle of the working classes during the Great Depression; long working hours,  little job security and meager salary, while the upper classes remain wealthy and bide their time. A tale of struggle of a working couple.
 October: Ten Days That Shook the World - 1928 - A Soviet Union film by Sergei Eisenstein which presents a dramatic retelling of the Russian revolution in 1917 which marked the beginnings of the Soviet Union.
Strike - 1925 - A Soviet Union film by Sergei Eisenstein.
Battleship Potemkin - 1925 - Eisenstein film covering one of the formative events of the Russian revolution, the mutiny of a ship's crew against their officers.
La Chinoise - 1967 - by French New Wave director Jean-Luc Godard about a group of young Maoist activists in Paris.

References 

Socialism
Socialism-related lists